The Inlandia Institute is a literary and cultural organization based in Riverside, California whose mission "is to recognize, support and expand literary activity in the Inland Empire, thereby deepening people’s awareness, understanding, and appreciation of this unique, complex and creatively vibrant area." Inlandia started as a joint project of the Riverside Public Library and Heyday Books in 2007 and was formally established as an independent non-profit organization in June 2009. 

Marion Mitchell-Wilson served as its Executive Director from its inception until 2012 when she stepped down due to health reasons.  Cati Porter, acclaimed Riverside poet and editor, became Executive Director of the Inlandia Institute after Mitchell-Wilson's departure.

History

The Inlandia Institute began as a result of the anthology Inlandia: A Literary Journey Through California's Inland Empire published by Heyday Books in 2006.  The positive response to the book - which provided the Inland Empire its first cohesive literary identity by bringing together in one literary endeavor a selection of the diverse communities that comprise the region - made it clear that there was a demand for more literary content from and about the Inland Empire. Shortly after the publication of the anthology, Malcolm Margolin, founder and owner of Heyday Books, began receiving numerous requests for more literary content produced by area residents.

After a book launch event in Palm Desert, Margolin and Mitchell-Wilson met with Riverside Public Library director Barbara Custen to discuss ways to build upon the success of the book.  It was Custen who coined the term "Inlandia Institute".

The City of Riverside and Heyday Books entered into a Memorandum of Understanding to establish the Inlandia Institute in August 2007. The Institute incorporated as an independent non-profit organization in 2009, at which point it moved  out of the Riverside Public Library to its current space in downtown Riverside.

Inlandia has been hosting the Inlandia Creative Writing Showcase since 2008.

List of Books

 Rose Hill: An Intermarriage before Its Time / Carlos Cortés 
 Flora of the Santa Ana River and Environs: With References to World Botany / Oscar F. Clarke 
 Two Chilies Dos Chiles / by Julianna Maya Cruz 
 Inlandia: A Literary Journey
 Vital Signs / Poetry by Juan Delgado; Photography by Thomas McGovern 
 2011 Writing from Inlandia / Inlandia Institute 
 2012 Writing from Inlandia / Inlandia Institute 
 Backyard Birds of the Inland Empire / Sheila N. Kee 
 Dream Street / Douglas McCulloh; foreword by D. J. Waldie 
 No Place for a Puritan: The Literature of California’s Deserts / Edited by Ruth Nolan

References

External links
 Inlandia Institute
 Inlandia: A Literary Journal
 Organizational Profile – National Center for Charitable Statistics (Urban Institute)

Organizations based in Riverside, California
Arts organizations based in California
California literature
Writers from Riverside, California
Inland Empire